"Thanks!" is the debut single of Hello! Project duo GAM. It is also the ending theme for the movie Sukeban Deka: Codename = Asamiya Saki, starring Aya Matsuura. The b-side, was also used as a filler track in the same movie.

The single was released on the Hachama label September 13, 2006 with a catalog entry of HKCN-50037. It debuted on the Oricon Daily Ranking singles chart at number 2, and finished with the weekly rank of number 5.

The Single V DVD containing the music video was released on September 20, 2006 with a catalog number of HKBN-50073.

Track listings

CD 
  Thanks!
  
  Thanks! (Instrumental)

Single V DVD 
  Thanks!
  Thanks! (Close Up Version)

References

External links 
 Thanks! entry on the Up-Front Works official website

Hello! Project songs
2006 singles
Japanese film songs
Songs written by Tsunku
2006 songs